Hypodoras forficulatus is the only species in the genus Hypodoras of the catfish (order Siluriformes) family Doradidae. This species is endemic to Peru where it is found in the upper Amazon basin and reaches a length of  SL.

References

Doradidae
Fish of South America
Freshwater fish of Peru
Fish of the Amazon basin
Taxa named by Carl H. Eigenmann
Monotypic freshwater fish genera
Catfish genera